The term combat service support (or CSS) is utilized by numerous military organizations throughout the world to describe entities that provide direct and indirect sustainment services to the groups that engage (or are potentially to be engaged) in combat.

United Kingdom

Defense Secretary Philip Hammond has described the United Kingdom's armed forces as having "teeth", units that are trained and equipped for actual fighting, that cannot function without an able, innovative "tail", units providing assistance such as logistical and transport capabilities. Specific groups involved in the U.K. armed forces include the Royal Army Medical Corps and Royal Logistic Corps.

United States

Also known as (CSS) falls under the umbrella of the United States Department of Defense providing the following support activities to a military division, brigade, battalion and other formations. In the United States, the term combat service support has been phased-out in favor of the term "sustainment."

Australia
Within the Australian Army, combat service support is provided to combat elements at various levels: first line (organic to battalion or regimental level), second line (at brigade level), and third line (at formation or higher). Thus, for example an infantry unit such as the 5th Battalion, Royal Australian Regiment will include a logistics company which fills supply, transportation and maintenance functions, while a combat brigade, such as the 7th Brigade, will be supported by a combat service support battalion such as the 7th Combat Service Support Battalion. At formation level, a CSS brigade – the 17th Sustainment Brigade – will provide health, signals, catering, transport, and other service support requirements.

See also

 Branches of the U.S. Army
 Combat arms
 Combat support
 Logistics
 Military logistics
 Military organization
 Principles of sustainment
 U.S. Army Combat Arms Regimental System
 U.S. Army Regimental System

References

Military units and formations by type